"Feel the Rhythm" is a song by Sweden-based musician and producer Dr. Alban, released in 1998 as the fourth and last single from his fifth studio album, I Believe (1997). It features backing vocals by singer Monica Löfgren, and peaked at number 13 in Spain and number 56 in Sweden.

Track listing

Charts

References

 

1998 singles
1998 songs
CNR Music singles
Dr. Alban songs
English-language Swedish songs
Songs written by Dr. Alban